Santa Caterina may refer to:

Places
Santa Catarina (state), Brazil
Santa Caterina Albanese, in the Province of Cosenza, Italy
Santa Caterina dello Ionio, in the Province of Catanzaro, Italy
Santa Caterina Villarmosa, in the Province of Caltanissetta, Italy
Santa Caterina di Valfurva, ski resort and frazione of the commune Valfurva in the Province of Sondrio, Italy
Santa Caterina, Roccalbegna, in the Province of Grosseto, Italy

Buildings
 Santa Caterina a Chiaia, a church in Naples
 Santa Caterina a Formiello, a church in Naples
 Santa Caterina (Livorno), a church in Livorno
 Santa Caterina d'Alessandria, a church in Palermo
 Santa Caterina d'Alessandria, a church in Pisa, in the Province of Tuscany, Italy
 Santa Caterina a Magnanapoli, a church in Rome
 Santa Caterina a Via Giulia, a church in the Via Giulia in Rome
 Santa Caterina dei Funari, a church in Rome
 Santa Caterina del Sasso, a monastery on the shore of Lake Maggiore
 Santa Caterina, Urbania, a church in Urbania, Marche, Italy

See also
 Santa Catarina (disambiguation)
 Sainte-Catherine (disambiguation)
 St. Catherine (disambiguation)